Soar Valley College is an 11-16 co-educational comprehensive secondary school in Leicester, Leicestershire, England. It was designated a Maths and Computing specialist college in September 2004.

As part of the Building Schools for the Future initiative, the old building was demolished in 2009 and turned into playing fields, and a new building was built on the previous playing fields at a cost of approximately £21.5 million. The school hosted the Special Olympics netball games in 2009 on their newly built netball courts, known as the "Soar Valley Netball Centre" on the other side of the campus from the new building. It became co-educational in 2016 and has one acre of land. The school has a lanyard system with different colours to show the different years.

Notable alumni include:
 Parminder Nagra, actress
 Rakhee Thakrar, actress

References

External links 
 

Secondary schools in Leicester
Community schools in Leicester